KIDN-FM (95.9 FM) is a radio station licensed to serve Hayden, Colorado, United States.  The station is owned by Patricia MacDonald Garber and Peter Benedetti and the broadcast license is held by AlwaysMountainTime, LLC.

It broadcasts a hot adult contemporary format branded as "The Lift FM" to the Steamboat Springs, Colorado, area.

The station was assigned the KIDN call sign by the U.S. Federal Communications Commission (FCC) on April 10, 1992.

The station's original format is unknown. Until 2010, the station was known as "Jack FM" then adopted its "KIDN The Mountain" branding. However, the website redirects to http://alwaysmountaintime.com/kidn/ which shows "The Lift FM" as its current branding.

Translator
KIDN-FM programming is also carried on broadcast translator stations to extend or improve the coverage area of the station.

Construction permit
On December 2, 2010, KIDN was granted an FCC construction permit to change the city of license to Burns, Colorado, move to a new transmitter site, decrease ERP to 72 watts and increase HAAT to 850 meters.

References

External links
KIDN The Lift FM - Facebook page.
KIDN official website

IDN
Radio stations established in 1990
Routt County, Colorado
1990 establishments in Colorado